Mark C. Alexander is an American attorney, law professor, educator, and in the last aforementioned capacity the dean of the Villanova University Charles Widger School of Law. He was previously an associate dean for academics and law professor at Seton Hall University in New Jersey, as well as a political activist and campaign specialist.

Beginning in January 2007, Alexander served as a senior advisor to Barack Obama's presidential campaign. Early on, Alexander served as policy director, building Obama's network of policy experts and providing overall strategic guidance. As New Jersey state director in the primaries, Alexander ran all campaign operations in his home state. After the election, he served on the Presidential Transition Team.

Biography
Alexander is the son of Adele (Logan), an historian, and attorney Clifford Alexander Jr.(1933-2022) His family moved from New York City to Washington, DC when his father began public service during the John F. Kennedy administration. His father also served under President Lyndon B. Johnson, and was appointed by the Jimmy Carter administration as the first African-American Secretary of the Army. Mark has an older sister Elizabeth, who became a poet and professor at Yale University.

Alexander graduated from college and law school, both at Yale. He became active in Democratic Party politics. He has worked for U.S. Senators Edward Kennedy and Howard Metzenbaum. In 1999–2000, Alexander served as Issues Director for the Bill Bradley for President Campaign. He was General Counsel to Cory Booker in the 2006 Newark Municipal elections and for Booker's transition team after his election as mayor. He also served as a law professor at Seton Hall University.

In 2010, President Barack Obama appointed Alexander to the 12-member J. William Fulbright Foreign Scholarship Board established by Congress to supervise the global Fulbright Program.

In 2013, Alexander unsuccessfully challenged incumbent Nia Gill in the Democratic primary for the state senate position in New Jersey's 34th Legislative District.

Alexander was a longtime resident of Montclair, NJ.

In July 2016, he became Arthur J. Kania Dean and Professor of Law of the Villanova University Charles Widger School of Law.

References

External links
Seton Hall faculty page
Mark C. Alexander, "The Politics of Dialect and Race as a Social Construct", Huffington Post, 21 March 2010

Living people
New Jersey Democrats
New Jersey lawyers
People from Montclair, New Jersey
Year of birth missing (living people)